Mario Iván Guerrero Ramírez (born 30 November 1977) is a Honduran former footballer who last played for Fort Lauderdale Strikers in the North American Soccer League. He was the club captain and also served as an assistant coach.

Career

Club
Guerrero began his career with F.C. Motagua in Honduras, playing with the team from 1996 until transferring overseas in 2000.  He moved to the English Premiership to play for Coventry City along with compatriot Jairo Martínez. He left the UK in October 2002 to rejoin Motagua and then moved to C.A. Peñarol in Uruguay in 2004, before his move to Chicago Fire of Major League Soccer.

Major League Soccer
He served as Chicago's lone representative in the 2005 MLS All-Star Game; and won the Fire's 2005 Fire/Honda MVP and Fire Defender of the Year awards.

On 21 November 2007 he was selected by San Jose Earthquakes in the 2007 MLS Expansion Draft.  He was later traded to D.C. United on 31 July 2008 in exchange for a partial allocation. He made his D.C. United debut on 2 August 2008 as a starting left midfielder in a 2–0 win against Kansas City Wizards.

Guerrero was traded to Colorado Rapids in February 2009 as part of the deal taking Christian Gómez back to D.C. United. He was waived by Colorado on 17 June 2009.

Retirement
He retired in 2011 playing for F.C. Motagua.

Fort Lauderdale Strikers
On 24 January 2013, Guerrero ended retirement by signing with Fort Lauderdale Strikers of the North American Soccer League. In his first season with the Strikers he led the team in assists with six. Guerrero is captain of the club for the 2014 season. Following the dismissal of head coach Marcelo Neveleff on June 7, 2015, Guerrero was named interim head coach for the Strikers final spring season match against Minnesota United FC. On April 30, 2015, it was announced that Günter Kronsteiner would be returning as Strikers head coach. Guerrero will remain as an assistant coach on Kronsteiner's staff and also still be a part of the Strikers player roster.

International career
Guerrero made his debut for Honduras in a March 1999 UNCAF Nations Cup match against Belize and has earned a total of 84 caps, scoring 4 goals. He has represented his country in 33 FIFA World Cup qualification matches and played at the 1999, 2001, 2005 and 2009 UNCAF Nations Cups as well as at the 2000, 2005 and 2007 CONCACAF Gold Cups.

He was a member of the national squad who competed at the 2000 Summer Olympics in Sydney.

His final international was an October 2010 friendly match against Guatemala.

International goals
Scores and results list Honduras' goal tally first.

Personal life
Guerrero is a permanent resident of the United States.

Honours and awards

Club
F.C. Motagua
 Liga Nacional: 1997–98 A, 1997–98 C, 1999–2000 A, 1999–2000 C, 2010–11 C
 Honduran Super Cup: 1997–98

D.C. United
 Lamar Hunt U.S. Open Cup: 2008

Chicago Fire Soccer Club
 Lamar Hunt U.S. Open Cup: 2006

Country
Honduras
 CONCACAF Men's Olympic Qualifying Tournament: 2000

References

External links

 Profile – Fort Lauderdale Strikers

1977 births
Living people
People from Comayagua
Association football defenders
Honduran footballers
Honduras international footballers
Olympic footballers of Honduras
Footballers at the 2000 Summer Olympics
2000 CONCACAF Gold Cup players
2001 UNCAF Nations Cup players
2005 UNCAF Nations Cup players
2005 CONCACAF Gold Cup players
2007 CONCACAF Gold Cup players
2009 UNCAF Nations Cup players
F.C. Motagua players
Coventry City F.C. players
Peñarol players
Chicago Fire FC players
San Jose Earthquakes players
D.C. United players
Colorado Rapids players
Fort Lauderdale Strikers players
Honduran expatriate footballers
Expatriate footballers in England
Expatriate footballers in Uruguay
Expatriate soccer players in the United States
Honduran expatriate sportspeople in England
Honduran expatriate sportspeople in Uruguay
Honduran expatriate sportspeople in the United States
Liga Nacional de Fútbol Profesional de Honduras players
Premier League players
Major League Soccer players
Major League Soccer All-Stars
North American Soccer League players
Pan American Games silver medalists for Honduras
Footballers at the 1999 Pan American Games
Medalists at the 1999 Pan American Games
Pan American Games medalists in football